Yakkatol (Russian and Tajik: Яккатол) is a village in Sughd Region, northern Tajikistan. It is part of the jamoat Sabriston in the city of Istaravshan.

It is located along the M34 highway.

References

Populated places in Sughd Region